Steamboat Rock Consolidated Schools Building, also known as the Steamboat Rock Community School, is a historic building located in Steamboat Rock, Iowa, United States.  The first school in town was a one-room school that opened a year after the town was platted in 1855.  A two-story brick school building was completed in 1869.  Beginning in 1919 rural school districts began to merge with the Steamboat Rock district, which began to substantially increase the student population.  The main part of this school building was completed in 1928.  The gymnasium/music room/shop building was added in 1956 to accommodate the post World War II baby boom.  As the 20th century continued the population in rural areas declined, which affected enrollment.  The Steamboat Rock School merged with the Wellsburg and Ackley-Geneva districts in 1997, and this building was left empty.  The city acquired it in 1999, and it now houses a variety of retail businesses and offices.  The building was listed on the National Register of Historic Places in 2004.

References

School buildings completed in 1928
Defunct schools in Iowa
Modernist architecture in Iowa
Buildings and structures in Hardin County, Iowa
National Register of Historic Places in Hardin County, Iowa
School buildings on the National Register of Historic Places in Iowa
1928 establishments in Iowa